Alfonsas Dargis (12 May 1909, in Reivyčiai, Mažeikiai parish – 13 January 1996, in Friedrichshafen, Baden-Württemberg land, buried in Friedrichshafen cemetery) was a Lithuanian painter, graphic artist, set designer and poet.

References 

1909 births
1996 deaths
Lithuanian painters